Football is one of the leading sports in the small Principality of Monaco, enjoying large popularity alongside motor racing, yachting, and tennis. It is governed by the Monegasque Football Federation.

International Football

Monaco is one of two sovereign European states (along with the Vatican City) that is not a UEFA member and does not have a national team competing in UEFA Euro qualifiers or FIFA World Cup qualifiers. The cause of this may be the historically close ties to France, but this is also true of Andorra, while they have their own separate team. It may be purely because Monaco have never applied to join UEFA, despite fulfilling all the required criteria. In recent years, there has reportedly been more interest in achieving this status. 

The Monaco national team instead tend to play small-scale matches against non-FIFA members, usually across the border in Cap-d'Ail.

Domestic football

Club football

Domestic football within the principality is governed by the Monegasque Football Federation, founded in 2000.

AS Monaco
Football in Monaco is dominated by AS Monaco, who were founded in 1919 and play in the French Ligue 1, which they have won on seven occasions, also winning five French Cups in the process. The club have traditionally been heavily backed by the monarchy, with large financial support which helps the club compete with teams from much larger cities. The club plays at the Stade Louis II, where average attendances have sometimes been as low as 5,000 demonstrating the need for financial aid to compete with teams who draw crowds several times that figure. 

In 2004, they were runners-up in the UEFA Champions League to FC Porto, widely regarded as the most prestigious club tournament in world-wide football. Their success and the large financial subsidy they receive has caused occasional bad feelings; it has been proposed, often by rival clubs in the Ligue 1, that AS Monaco should not be allowed to qualify for European competition from the French League, thereby taking a place allocated for a French team, with some even suggesting they should be expelled from French football altogether. 

One compromise that has been suggested is that AS Monaco continue to play in the French League system, but take part in a yearly qualifying tournament to earn the right to represent Monaco in European competition, as football teams in Canada do by the Canadian Championship. This solution would require the Principality to gain full or associate member status of UEFA first.

Domestic cups
Despite the small size of the country, Monaco still has many teams (mostly works teams, set up by employers or employees of a company), and they compete yearly in different competitions, which are:
Challenge Prince Rainier III - the most prestigious cup in Monaco.
Trophée Ville de Monaco - the second level competition in the country.
Challenge Monégasque - the third most important competition in Monaco.

Super Cup
Previously Monaco hosted the UEFA Super Cup between the winners of the UEFA Champions League and the UEFA Cup. UEFA announced that from 2013 onwards, various stadiums will be used for the Super Cup.

Monaco stadiums

See also
Monaco national football team
List of football clubs in Monaco
Challenge Prince Rainier III
Non-FIFA international football

References

 

lt:Monako futbolo sistema